Hervé Milazzo (born April 26, 1975 in Mulhouse) is a French professional football player. Currently, he plays in the Championnat de France amateur for FC Mulhouse.

He played on the professional level in Ligue 2 for FC Mulhouse and Grenoble Foot 38.

1975 births
Living people
French footballers
Ligue 2 players
FC Mulhouse players
Grenoble Foot 38 players
Angoulême Charente FC players
Footballers from Mulhouse
Association football defenders